The 1969 Northern Ireland general election was held on Monday 24 February 1969. It was the last election to the Parliament of Northern Ireland before its abolition by the Northern Ireland Constitution Act 1973.

Unlike previous elections that produced a large unambiguous majority for the Ulster Unionist Party, this one gave more complex results. The Ulster Unionists were divided over a variety of reforms introduced by Prime Minister Terence O'Neill and this division spilled over into the election with official Ulster Unionist candidates standing either in support of or opposition to O'Neill and a number of independent pro O'Neill Unionists standing against opposing candidates. The results left O'Neill without a clear majority for his reforms and he resigned not long afterwards.

This was the first (and only) election since the 1929 general election to see changes to the constituencies. The Queen's University of Belfast seat was abolished and four new constituencies were created in the suburbs of Belfast to compensate for population growth there.

Results

Electorate: 912,087 (778,031 in contested seats); Turnout: 71.9% (559,087).

Votes summary

Seats summary

Notable incumbents defeated
Eddie McAteer (Foyle), Nationalist Party leader, defeated by John Hume (Independent)
Paddy Gormley (Mid Londonderry), Nationalist Party, defeated by Ivan Cooper (Independent)

See also
List of members of the 12th House of Commons of Northern Ireland

Footnotes

References

Northern Ireland Parliamentary Election Results 

Northern Ireland general election
1969
Northern Ireland general election
1969 elections in Northern Ireland